Louis Vallin (16 August 1770 in Dormans – 25 December 1854 in Paris) was a French general.  He was involved on the Royalist side in the French intervention in Spain.  His name is inscribed in the 12th column on the Arc de Triomphe in Paris. He was a commander of the Order of Saint Louis and a grand officier of the Legion of Honor, as well as being made a baron under the 
First French Empire.

1770 births
1854 deaths
French generals
French commanders of the Napoleonic Wars
Commanders of the Order of Saint Louis
Grand Officiers of the Légion d'honneur
19th-century Viscounts of France
Names inscribed under the Arc de Triomphe
Barons of the First French Empire